Mount Skylight is a mountain in the Adirondack High Peaks in the Adirondack Mountains of New York. It gets its name from its open, bare and relatively flat summit, unusual in the Adirondack High Peaks.  Skylight is the fourth highest peak in New York.

A remote summit by any approach, it is nonetheless a favorite of hikers. It is famously distinguished by two large cairns that have grown on either end of the summit over the years, as 46er lore has it that carrying a rock up and placing it on them will ensure good weather.

A single trail goes up to the mountain's summit from the Four Corners junction between Skylight and Mount Marcy, its northern neighbor. As the name suggests, there are three ways to get there. Most commonly, hikers come from the west, via the Feldspar Brook Trail from the campsites at the Flowed Lands and climb the peak in conjunction with a visit to Lake Tear of the Clouds (often considered the source of the Hudson River), and a climb up neighboring, trail-less Gray Peak. The trailhead can also be reached by descending from Marcy to the north, or via Panther Gorge and Elk Lake to the southeast, all very lengthy trips that are usually done via an overnight backpack.

Gallery

Notes

External links 
 
  Summitpost.org: Mount Skylight

Mountains of Essex County, New York
Adirondack High Peaks
Mountains of New York (state)